Insyafadya Salsabillah (born 10 March 2002) is an Indonesian footballer who plays a forward for Asprov Jatim and the Indonesia women's national team.

Club career
Salsabillah has played for Asprov Jatim in Indonesia.

International career 
Salsabillah represented Indonesia at the 2022 AFC Women's Asian Cup.

References

External links

2002 births
Living people
Sportspeople from Surabaya
Indonesian women's footballers
Women's association football forwards
Indonesia women's international footballers